Margaret Radcliffe with the name in religion of Margaret Paul (1582–1654) was an English nun who briefly served as abbess of the English Convent of Poor Clares, Gravelines, and was also the founding superior of English convents in Brussels and Aire.

Life
Radcliffe was born in the 1580s. Her parents were Isabel (born Grey) and Sir Francis Radcliffe (1563–1622) of Dilston near Corbridge in Northumberland, and Derwentwater in Cumberland. She was their second daughter but the first of their four daughters to commit to religious life. Her father was a noted recusant and he had been taken for questioning after the Gunpowder Plot in 1605. Building at the family seat including a chapel was said to have been funded by money left over after the gunpowder plot failed.

The Radcliffes were Catholics and at the time it was illegal to be a practising Catholic so Margaret went to the Spanish Netherlands. At Gravelines she was clothed in the habit of the Poor Clares on 2 July 1611, and became a full member of the community by taking her vows on 3 July 1612. Mary Ward had founded the community in 1607 but subsequently left. Elizabeth Tyldesley, Mother Clare Mary Ann, was elected as abbess in 1615.

In 1617, Radcliffe's sister Elizabeth joined her and two years later another two of their sisters, Dorothy and Ann, were living in the convent. When she made her vows her age was given as 27, so she would have been 37 when she and her sister, Elizabeth, were sent to Brussels in 1622 to found a new Franciscan convent there. She was to be abbess and her sister was to be her assistant. They were there for four years and Radcliffe created a regime for the nuns although she later feared that it was too tough as it was based on her own training as a Poor Clare. However it went well and in time they could leave with a new abbess appointed.

In September 1626 a Franciscan commissary deposed Tyldesley as abbess at Gravelines and appointed Radcliffe to replace her. This was a very unpopular move and a fire broke out at the convent which was supposed by some to be divine retribution. Tyldesley was restored to her former position in 1627 after Radcliffe, and ten others, were moved to the Poor Clare convent in Dunkirk.

In 1629 a new convent was established at Aire in Artois with Radcliffe as abbess. The 24 founding members included those who had followed her to Dunkirk two years before. Radcliffe died at Aire in 1654.

References

1582 births
1654 deaths
English Roman Catholic abbesses